Frank Lofranco (born February 2, 1969) is a Canadian former soccer player and head coach.

Career 
Lofranco played in the National Soccer League with Toronto Italia in 1986. The following season he played in the Canadian Soccer League with Toronto Blizzard. After two seasons with the Blizzard he was traded to the North York Rockets. In 1991, he returned to the National Soccer League to play with North York Strikers. In 1992, he returned to play with the Toronto Blizzard in their final season in the Canadian Soccer League. He played the following season with Toronto in the American Professional Soccer League, where he appeared in 19 matches and recorded two goals.

International career 
Lofranco made his international debut for the Canada men's national under-17 soccer team on May 13, 1985, against Costa Rica at the 1985 CONCACAF U-17 Championship. In 1987, he played with the Canada men's national under-20 soccer team at the 1987 Pan American Games.

Managerial career 
Lofranco was named the head coach in 2003 for the Ottawa Fury Women in the USL W-League. In 2008, he resigned from his position as Fury head coach. In 2008, he became the technical director for the Ottawa Fury.

References 

1969 births
Living people
American Professional Soccer League players
Canadian National Soccer League players
Canadian soccer coaches
Canadian Soccer League (1987–1992) players
Canadian soccer players
North York Rockets players
Soccer players from Toronto
Toronto Blizzard (1986–1993) players
Toronto Italia players
Footballers at the 1987 Pan American Games
Pan American Games competitors for Canada
Association footballers not categorized by position